The principles of Sikhism state that women have the same souls as men and thus possess an equal right to cultivate their spirituality with equal chances of achieving salvation. Women in Sikhism participate in all religious, cultural, social, and secular activities including lead religious congregations, take part in the Akhand Path (the continuous recitation of the Holy Scriptures), perform Kirtan (congregational singing of hymns), and work as a Granthis.

Guru Nanak proclaimed the equality of men and women, and both he and the gurus that succeeded him encouraged men and women to take a full part in all the activities of Sikh worship and practice. Sikh history also has recorded the role of women, portraying them as equals to men in service, devotion, sacrifice, and bravery.

Sri Guru Granth Sahib Ji, Raag Aasaa Mehal 1, Page 473: "So why call her [women] bad? From her, kings are born. From woman, woman is born; without woman, there would be no one at all."  Guru Nanak fought for women's rights and expressed his teachings of equality. He supported women having all rights and privileges a man has.

History

The Sikh Gurus and various Sikh saints did much to progress women's rights which were considerably downtrodden in the 15th century. To ensure a new equal status for women, the Gurus made no distinction between the sexes in matters of initiation, instruction or participation in sangat (holy fellowship) and pangat (eating together).

Guru Amar Das 
According to Sarup Das Bhalla, Mahima Prakash, Guru Amar Das disfavoured the use of the veil by women. He assigned women to supervise some communities of disciples and preached against the custom of sati. Guru Amar Das also raised his voice against female infanticide.

Guru Gobind Singh 
Guru Gobind Singh instructed the Khalsa to not associate with kanyapapi, those who sin towards woman, and the Guru was also strongly against the objectification of woman. The Guru gave those women who were baptized into the Khalsa, the surname of Kaur, the status of a sovereign princess.

Ram Singh Namdhari 
Baba Ram Singh also did much for woman's rights including opposing infanticide, selling of young girls into servitude, the dowry system, the pardah system, and endeavored to achieve higher standards of literacy, and the remarriage of widows.

Singh Sabha 
During the Sikh revival movement of Singh Sabha beginning in the 1870s, the Singh Sabha raised its voice against the purdah system, female infanticide, child marriage, sati, bad conditions of widows, practice of dowry and extravagant expenditure during marriage.

Practices Condemned

Sutak
Sutak is a belief associated with impurity of the house on account of birth of a child. It is also believed that women are most prone to such impurity. Guru Nanak condemned such notions of pollution/impurity in no uncertain terms.

Asceticism
The concept of Sannyasa had influenced attitude towards women in India. The inherent attraction of female was considered a temptation something that a Sannyasi must avoid. The Gurus, however, did not regard women as hurdles for attaining salvation. They rejected the idea of renunciation and regarded family life, if led in a righteous manner, better than the life of an ascetic. Instead of celibacy and renunciation, Guru Nanak recommends grihastha—the life of a householder.

Menstrual Taboo

Menstruation does not lead to women being considered impure in Sikhism, and women's behavior is not restricted during the time when she is menstruating.

In The Feminine Principle in the Sikh vision of the transcendent, Nikky Guninder Kaur-Singh writes:

 'The denigration of the female body "expressed in many cultural and religious taboos surrounding menstruation and child-Birth" is absent in the Sikh worldview. Guru Nanak openly chides those who attribute pollution to women because of menstruation'.

Polygamy

In a culture where monogamy is generally the rule, Sikh polygamy is exceptionally rare.

Female Infanticide
Female infanticide is prohibited, and the Rahitnamas (codes of conduct) prohibit Sikhs from having any contact or relationship with those who indulge in this practice.

Sati (widow burning)

Widow burning, or sati, is expressly forbidden by scripture.

As a practical step towards discouraging the practice of sati Sikhism permits remarriage of widows.

Veil
Sikhism was highly critical of all forms of strict veiling, Sikh Gurus condemned it and rejected seclusion and veiling of women, which saw decline of veiling among some classes during late medieval period. This was stressed by Bhagat Kabir.

Dowry
Guru Ram Das condemned the ritual of dowry.

Equality

According to Sikhism, men and women are two sides of the same human coin. There is a system of interrelationship and interdependence whereby man is born of women, and women are born of man's seed. By these doctrines a man cannot feel secure and complete in his life without a woman, and man's success is proportional to the love and support of the woman who shares her life with him (and vice versa). The founder of Sikhism, Guru Nanak, reportedly said in 1499 that "[it] is a woman who keeps the race going" and that we should not "consider woman cursed and condemned, [when] from woman are born leaders and kings."

Status of Women

Historical

There are many examples of women who are considered models of service and sacrifice throughout Sikh history, such as Mata Gujri, Mai Bhago, Mata Sundari, Mata Desan Kaur, Rani Sahib Kaur, Rani Sada Kaur, Rani Datar Kaur and Maharani Jind Kaur.

Current
In the present-day democratic politics of India, a fair amount of organizations study and work in order to rid women of many of their disadvantages. They have access to political franchise and new opportunities for advancement have opened up for them. Sikh women have shown enterprise in several fields and are among the most progressive in education and in the professions such as teaching and medicine. Within the Sikh system, they are the equals of men. They can lead congregational services and participate in akhand paths, uninterrupted readings of scripture to be accomplished within seventy-two hours. They vote with men to elect Sikhs' central religious body, the Shiromani Gurdwara Parbandhak Committee, which administers their places of worship (Gurdwara).

Sikhs are obligated to treat women as equals, and gender discrimination in Sikh society has no religious basis. However, gender equality has been difficult to achieve in practice due to heavy social, cultural, and caste-related pressure. It's worth noting that the caste system itself goes against the core principles of Sikhism.

Though equality for women has always been a major attribute of Sikhism and a great number of women have made significant contributions, it is important to note that it is still a work in progress.  In the 1990s a group of Sikh women requested to wash the floors or the Darbar Sahib and were denied.  Unlike men, women are still not allowed to assist in carrying the paliquin carrying the primary scriptures in its path to and from the Golden Temple. Also, women make up less than 20% of the SGPC members.

While diaspora women take lead in opening many aspects of ritual life for women still female participation in various religious rituals and institutions is very uncommon. Ritual services like ‘chaur seva’ wherein one uses an implement called the chaur to fan the Granth, or Sukh-aasan ritual at Harmandir Sahib ritual where the Guru Granth Sahib is shifted from the sanctum sanctorum to the Akal Takht precincts or Kirtan at golden temple,  are mostly male-dominated. So also profession of Granthis to Gurudwara management  are mostly male dominated fields. Part of the problem while religion officially does not hold menstruating women to be impure still patriarchy in Sikh society holds the same as taboo.

Kaur Project
Kaur Project is a project that seeks to actively create spaces for Sikh female youth to learn and lead the Hukumnama, Ardaas, Sahajpaath, Akandpaath and Parshaad seva.

Notable women in Sikhism
Mata Kaulan, disciple of Guru Hargobind
Mata Sahib Kaur, wife of Guru Gobind Singh and leader of the Khalsa for 40 years
Mata Susheel Kaur, wife of Banda Singh Bahadur who fought alongside him
Sada Kaur, chief of the Kanhaiya Misl from 1789 to 1821
Maharani Datar Kaur, consort of Maharaja Ranjit Singh and mother of Maharaja Kharak Singh she served as a commander during the Battle of Multan (1818)
Maharani Chand Kaur, ruler of Sikh Empire
Rani Jindan, wife of Ranjit Singh
Princess Sophia Duleep Singh,  prominent suffragette of womans civil rights movemenent in the United Kingdom 
Mata Khivi, notable for her contributions to the establishment of Langar
Mata Tripta, mother of Guru Nanak
Bebe Nanaki, elder sister of Guru Nanak
Mai Bhago, prominent Sikh warrior

See also

 Women in the Guru Granth Sahib
 Sikh feminism
 Women in India
 Women's rights
 Legal rights of women in history
 Kaur, the name bestowed upon Sikh girls and women by Guru Gobind Singh in 1699

References

 Guru Granth Sahib, p 73.
 Guru Granth Sahib, p 788.

External links

 Sikh women
 Guru Quotes on women
 www.sikhs.org
 www.sikhnarimanch.com
 Concepts In Sikhism – Edited by Dr. Surinder Singh Sodhi
 Important women in the Sikh History
 Sikh Spirituality and Contribution of Women